Rockgiganten vs. Strassenköter (also Rockgiganten vs. Straßenköter; "Rock giants vs. street mutts") is a split EP by German bands Die Ärzte and Terrorgruppe. Both bands contribute two songs each. The first track "Mach die Augen zu" was later released on the Die Ärzte tribute album Götterdämmerung (1997).

Track listing
Terrorgruppe
1. "Mach die Augen zu" [Close the eyes] - 3:13
2. "Kopfüber in die Hölle" [Headfirst into hell] - 2:16
Die Ärzte
3. "Namen vergessen" [Name forgotten] - 3:19
4. "Rumhängen" [Hanging around] - 4:58

1997 singles
Split EPs
German-language albums